David Htan (born 13 May 1990) is a Burmese professional footballer who plays as a right-back for Myanmar national football team and Shan United F.C.

Style of play
Despite lacking in height, he has a good positional sense and an ability to cleanly win one-on-one challenges.

Club career
David played for Yangon United from 2009 to 2018 before joining Shan United and then returning to Yangon in 2022.

International

International goals
Scores and results list Myanmar's goal tally first.

Honours

Club

Yangon United
Myanmar National League (5):  2011, 2012, 2013, 2015, 2018
MFF Charity Cup (3): 2013, 2016, 2018
General Aung San Shield (2): 2011, 2018

Shan United
Myanmar National League (3):  2017, 2019, 2020
MFF Charity Cup (2): 2019, 2020

Individual
Myanmar National League Player of the Year: 2019

References

1990 births
Living people
People from Kachin State
Burmese footballers
Myanmar international footballers
Yangon United F.C. players
Burmese Christians
Association football defenders